Fairy is an international brand, primarily used for washing up liquid and dishwasher detergent, owned by the American multinational consumer products company, Procter & Gamble. The brand originated in the United Kingdom and is now used on a number of P&G products in various markets.

It is closely related to the Dawn dishwashing product range sold in the USA and to Dreft, Yes and JAR brands used by P&G in various European and international markets.

In the United Kingdom and Ireland, Fairy Liquid is traditionally green, as mentioned in the well-known advertising jingle "Now hands that do dishes can feel as soft as your face with mild green Fairy Liquid".

P&G use the Fairy brand in many European markets for premium hand and automatic dishwashing products and also for a range of non-bio and sensitive skin focused laundry products in the UK and Ireland.

Fairy Liquid is available in a variety of colour, scent, format and packaging designs which, vary somewhat in each market. The original white bottle with red cap used in the United Kingdom and Ireland was replaced with PET bottles.

Fairy soap bars were originally manufactured by Newcastle upon Tyne company Thomas Hedley Co., which was acquired by Procter & Gamble in 1927.

50th anniversary

In February 2010, Fairy brought back the original washing-up-liquid bottle (which was used until 2000) to celebrate 50 years of the brand. Nanette Newman, who appeared in the 1980s TV advertisements, returned for a new campaign to promote the launch.

Other products
In the United Kingdom and Ireland, Fairy is also a longstanding brand of non-biological laundry detergent, the original soap-based variant being known as Fairy Snow. Fairy Non-Bio has added fabric-conditioner to its product range. Like Fairy dish detergents, its traditional trademark is a walking baby.

Fairy was also a brand of soap in those countries, characteristically green in colour and available both in the form of larger rectangular 155g blocks for laundry and other household purposes  and in the smaller rounded 125g size as toilet soap,  where it used the same "walking baby" trademark as the laundry powder and was marketed as a pure, mild product. It was suddenly discontinued by the manufacturers in about 2009 to the disapproval of its faithful customer base.

The Fairy brand has expanded further from the soap-based products, and is now also used on automatic dishwashing products, the latest being Fairy Active Bursts. These are pouches of powder and specially formulated washing-up liquid, specifically designed for domestic dishwashers. Other variants have included a power spray for cleaning pots and pans, and a foam/mousse.

International Markets

 In Egypt, Fairy competes with Henkel's Pril, and takes second place to Pril in market share. It is notable for its aggressive advertising campaign featuring actresses from Egyptian television soap operas emphasizing its strength (which it claims is four times higher than Pril).
 Fairy is also sold in Germany: in 2000 it was briefly renamed Dawn (the brand used in the North American market), but, after sharply declining sales due to an unfamiliar brand, the Fairy name was revived in 2002.
 In Sweden and Norway, P&G premium dishwashing products are branded as Yes, as seen on the adjacent picture. It was introduced in 1961 and is by far the biggest-selling detergent in Sweden.
 In Belgium and the Netherlands the same product range is sold as Dreft. The same name also refers to another brand of detergent also made by Procter & Gamble.
 In the Czech Republic, Slovakia and Hungary similar P&G products are sold as Jar (pronunciation /yar/) and has been available since the 1960s. Its name comes from Janeček (then CEO of the company) and Ranný (the product inventor), but coincidentally it means spring in Czech and Slovakian. The name is synonymous for detergent in Czech Republic and Slovakia.
 In Saudi Arabia, it has been sold since the 1970s.
Fairy products have been sold in Iran since 2005.

See also
 Dawn - a similar dishwashing detergent produced by Procter & Gamble for the North American market.
 Persil (Unilever) a rival brand of laundry detergent and dishwashing detergent
 :de:Pril

References

External links
 
 The History of Fairy Soap
Fairy Products list

Procter & Gamble brands
Detergents
Cleaning product brands
British Royal Warrant holders